Teten Masduki (born 6 May 1963) is an Indonesian social activist involved in public clearinghouse for information about corruption, collusion, and nepotism of Indonesia. He was awarded Ramon Magsaysay Award in 2005. He was appointed as the Minister for Cooperatives and Small and Medium Enterprises in the Onward Indonesia Cabinet in October 2019.

On 2 September 2015, he was appointed by President as Chief of Presidential Staff replacing Luhut Binsar Pandjaitan.

References

1963 births
Living people
Ramon Magsaysay Award winners
Indonesian activists
Working Cabinet (Joko Widodo)
Onward Indonesia Cabinet
Government ministers of Indonesia
Sundanese people